The team dressage in equestrian at the 2012 Olympic Games in London was held at Greenwich Park from 2 to 7 August. The competition was performed on raised arena platforms for the first time, which were suspended by support struts.

Competition format

The team and individual dressage competitions used the same results. Dressage had three phases, with only the first two used in the team competition. The first phase was the Grand Prix. The top seven teams advanced to the second phase, the Grand Prix Special. The results of that phase (ignoring the previous Grand Prix scores) produced the final results. Each phase involves a different test for horse and rider to perform, which is made up of a series of movements that horses perform in a rectangular arena  The teams scores were determined by judges Leif Torblas of Denmark, Maribel Alonso of Mexico, Jean Michel Roudier of France, Gary Rockwell of the United States, Wim Ernes of the Netherlands, Evi Eisenhardt of Germany, and Stephan Clarke who is the president of the International Equestrian Federations ground jury

Schedule

All times are British Summer Time (UTC+1)

Results

References

Team dressage